The thirteenth legislative assembly election, of Tamil Nadu was held on 8 May 2006. It was held for all 234 constituencies to elect the government in the state for the following five years. The votes were counted three days later on 11 May 2006 and all the results were out by the end of the day. The Dravida Munnetra Kazhagam-led (DMK) front won the elections, with the DMK emerging as the single-largest party with 96 seats, and its leader, M Karunanidhi was sworn in as Chief Minister for a fifth and final term. This election marked the first time the state saw a hung assembly with no party gaining a majority of its own. As a result, DMK formed a minority government with its allies, which is the first in the state since the 1952 election.  13th Assembly was instituted due to this election.

The election marked the electoral debut of the actor Vijayakanth and his political outfit, the Desiya Murpokku Dravida Kazhagam (DMDK). Though the party could only gain a single seat, it cut into the vote share of both DMK and AIADMK and emerged as a third alternative to the existing two Dravidian parties.

Polling 
48848 polling stations were set up for electorate, that sized up to 46,607 eligible voters.

Political parties and the alliances

Tamil Nadu has a remarkable history of being dominated by the local parties, DMK or AIADMK, while the national parties have a strong presence in other states. The parties have resorted to forming alliances in the last few elections to take on each sides for power.

Striking changes in the alliances included the swap of Marumalarchi Dravida Munnetra Kazhagam (MDMK) from DMK led Democratic Progressive Alliance to All India Anna Dravida Munnetra Kazhagam (AIADMK) led alliance. While Dalit Panthers of India joined the AIADMK alliance, all other major parties in the fray such as Pattali Makkal Katchi (PMK), Indian National Congress, CPM and Communist Party of India (CPI), aligned themselves with the DMK party.

There were two notable new parties — Desiya Murpokku Dravida Kazhagam (DMDK) formed in September 2005 by actor-turned-politician Vijaykanth, and Lok Paritran formed by Indian Institutes of Technology graduates in February 2006. Both contested alone in this elections.

The contest was between two major alliances in a seat-sharing agreement, the AIADMK alliance and the DMK alliance. These archrivals had a face-off in 106 seats.

Exit Polls  predicted a 157-167 seats in favour of the DMK alliance, while the AIADMK alliance was expected to get 64-74 seats in the assembly.

Before the 2009 Lok Sabha Elections, the Pattali Makkal Katchi left the DMK, citing differences with its leader M. Karunanidhi, and joined the AIADMK, and the Third Front.

Seat allotments

AIADMK Front
Source: Junior Vikatan

DMK Front 
Source: Junior Vikatan

Opinion polling

Pre-poll surveys

Exit polls

Voting and results
The 2006 Tamil Nadu State Elections saw a record voter turnout of 70.70% an 11% increase compared to the last 2001 elections and the highest since the 1991 elections which saw an 85% voter turnout. The ruling party AIADMK was voted out of power with the DMK alliance regaining power after losing out in the previous elections with a paltry 37 seats. This time however, no party reached the simple majority of 117 of the 234 seats. DMK grabbed the highest number of seats (96) for any contesting party, while AIADMK followed with 61 seats. The Congress won 34 seats while the other national party, Bharatiya Janata Party (BJP), drew blank after contesting alone in this elections. PMK managed to win 18 seats followed by the Communists (14 seats). MDMK, the party that jumped alliance won 6 seats and the DPI won 2 seats. DMDK, even while contesting in 232 seats managed to score just one seat, with the party leader actor vijayakant winning the seat he contested in Vridhachalam Constituency. There was 1 independent winner.

The split results paved way for the formation of the new coalition government led by DMK chief, the 82-year-old veteran politician Dr.M Karunanidhi, becoming the Chief Minister of Tamil Nadu for the fifth time, with the Congress unconditionally supporting his claim for Chief Ministership and government formation.

Due to the loss of key allies after the previous election, the All India Anna Dravida Munnetra Kazhagam (AIADMK), ended up losing both the 2004 Lok Sabha Election and the 2006 State Assembly Elections, to DMK led coalition that consisted of Dravida Munnetra Kazhagam (DMK), and former allies of AIADMK, Indian National Congress, left parties (Communist Party of India, Communist Party of India (Marxist)) and Pattali Makkal Katchi.

Results by pre-poll alliance

|-
! style="background-color:#E9E9E9;text-align:left;vertical-align:top;" |Alliance/Party
!style="width:4px" |
! style="background-color:#E9E9E9;text-align:right;" |Seats won
! style="background-color:#E9E9E9;text-align:right;" |Change†
! style="background-color:#E9E9E9;text-align:right;" |Popular Vote
! style="background-color:#E9E9E9;text-align:right;" |Vote %
! style="background-color:#E9E9E9;text-align:right;" |Adj. %‡
|-
! style="background-color:#FF0000; color:white"|DMK+ alliance
! style="background-color: " |
| 163
| +71
| 14,762,647
| colspan=2 style="text-align:center;vertical-align:middle;"| 44.8%
|-
|DMK
! style="background-color: #FF0000" |
| 96
| +65
| 8,728,716
| 26.5%
| 46.0%
|-
|INC
! style="background-color: #00FFFF" |
| 34
| +4
| 2,765,768
| 8.4%
| 43.5%
|-
|PMK
! style="background-color: #800080" |
| 18
| -2
| 1,863,749
| 5.7%
| 43.4%
|-
|CPI(M)
! style="background-color: #000080" |
| 9
| +3
| 872,674
| 2.7%
| 42.7%
|-
|CPI
! style="background-color: #0000FF" |
| 6
| +1
| 531,740
| 1.6%
| 40.4%
|-
! style="background-color:#009900; color:white"|AIADMK+ alliance
! style="background-color: " | 
| 69
| -64
| 13,166,445
| colspan=2 style="text-align:center;vertical-align:middle;"| 39.9%
|-
|AIADMK
! style="background-color: #008000" |
| 61
| -72
| 10,768,559
| 32.6%
| 40.8%
|-
|MDMK
! style="background-color: #FF00FF" |
| 6
| +6
| 1,971,565
| 6.0%
| 37.7%
|-
|VCK
! style="background-color: #FFFF00" |
| 2
| +2
| 426,321
| 1.3%
| 36.1%
|-
! style="background-color:Black; color:white"|Others
! style="background-color:black" |
| 2
| -7
| 5,062,463
| colspan=2 style="text-align:center;vertical-align:middle;"| 15.3%
|-
|DMDK
! style="background-color: #008080" |
| 1
| +1
| 2,764,223
| 8.4%
| 8.5%
|-
|BJP
! style="background-color: " |
| 0
| -6
| 666,823
| 2.0%
| 2.1%
|-
|IND
! style="background-color: #666666" |
| 1
| -2
| 995,345
| 3.0%
| 3.1%
|-
| style="text-align:center;" |Total
! style="background-color: " |
| 234
| –
| 32,991,555
| 100%
| style="text-align:center;" | –
|-
|}
Sources: Election Commission of India

†: Seat changes reflect the following mergers in parties from previous election. MADMK merged with Bharatiya Janata Party in 2002. TMC merged with the national party INC in 2002. Usilampatti FBL MLA L. Santhanam, joined AIADMK and contested in Sholavandan, after being expelled from his party by newly elected actor-turned party leader Karthik.
‡: Vote % reflects the percentage of votes the party received compared to the entire electorate that voted in this election. Adjusted (Adj.) Vote %, reflects the % of votes the party received per constituency that they contested.

Constituency wise results
The following table lists the winners and margin of victory in all constituencies.

See also 
Elections in Tamil Nadu
Legislature of Tamil Nadu
Government of Tamil Nadu

Footnotes

External links
 News coverage of the election on Rediff
 Tamil Nadu Legislative Assembly
 Indian Elections
 Rediff - Graphic: How the DMK wrested Tamil Nadu

2006 State Assembly elections in India
2006
2000s in Tamil Nadu
May 2006 events in India